Raúl Jorge Tignanelli Mascaró (born 17 January 1954 in Buenos Aires, Argentina), known as Raúl Taibo is an Argentine actor, whose work has been mainly in television.
In 1973 he played a title role in Hipólito y Evita and in 2014 starred in Necrofobia. He is best known for his role as Lautaro Lamas in the 1990-1 telenovela Una voz en el teléfono.

Filmography

Television 
 1971 "La Familia Duerme en Casa", Canal 9.
 1972 "Que Vida de Locos", Canal 9.
 1974 "Dos a quererse", Canal 13.
 1975 "Piel naranja", Canal 13. Terna Revelación del Año Martín Fierro.
 1975 "Lo Mejor de Nuestra Vida Nuestros Hijos...", Canal 9.
 1975 "Teatro Como en el Teatro", Canal 11.
 1975 "Teatro de Humor", Canal 9.
 1975 "Viernes de Pacheco", Canal 9.
 1976 "Alta comedia", Canal 9.
 1977 "Tiempo de Vivir", Canal 13.
 1979 "Andrea Celeste", ATC.
 1980 "Señorita Andrea", ATC.
 1982 "Laura mía", ATC.
 1983 "Rebelde y Solitario", ATC.
 1984 "Situación Límite", ATC.
 1986 "El Cisne Blanco", Puerto Rico.
 1986 "Venganza de mujer", Canal 9.
 1988 "Pasiones", Canal 9.
 1990 - 1991 "Una voz en el teléfono", Canal 9. Martín Fierro Mejor Teleteatro.
 1995 "Por siempre mujercitas", Canal 9.
 1995 - 1996 "90 60 90 Modelos", Canal 9.
 1997 "Te quiero, te quiero", Canal 9.
 1999 "Margaritas", América.
 2000 "Campeones", Canal 13.
 2001 "El sodero de mi vida", Canal 13.
 2002 "099 Central", Canal 13
 2004 "Culpable de este amor", Telefe
 2004 "Los Roldán", Telefe
 2004 "Yendo de la cama al living", Canal 7
 2005 "Amor en custodia", Telefe
 2006 "Los Ex", Telefe 
 2006 "Amas de casa desesperadas (Argentina)", Canal 13
 2006 - 2007 "La ley del amor", Telefe
 2008 - 2009 "Por amor a vos", Canal 13
 2009 - 2010 "Herencia de amor", Telefe
 2010 - 2011 "Malparida", Canal 13
 2012 "La dueña", Telefe
 2014 "Camino al amor", Telefe
 2015 Fronteras, Telefe

Film 
 Hipólito y Evita (1973)
 Los días que me diste (1975)
 Sin querer, queriendo (1985)
 Más loco que un crucero (1990)
 El entretenedor (1991)
 Hunabku (2007)
 El túnel de los huesos (2011)
 Necrofobia (2014)

Theatre 
 1972 "El Día que Secuestraron al Papa", de J. Bethancour. Teatro Astral.
 1973 "Estos Chicos de Ahora", de Alfonso Paso. Gira.
 1977 "Pijama de Seda", España.
 1981/82 "La Vida Fácil" o Los Galancitos, 
 1982/83 "Hasta Mañana si Dios Quiere", U.O.M.
 1983/84 "De Madrugada es más Lindo", de Abel Santa Cruz.
 1985 "Hotel Internacional", Mar del Plata. Teatro Provincial.
 1987 "Día de Fiesta", Mar del Plata. Teatro Hermitage.
 1989/90 "Golpe de Sol", Teatros Hermitage y Ateneo.
 1991/92 "Y Mis Pantalones donde están", Teatro del Globo y Gira.
 1994/95 "Las Mariposas Son Libres", Gira.
 1999 "Las alegres mujeres de Shakespeare".
 2005 "Bombones y champagne", Villa Carlos Paz, Córdoba.
 2010/11 "Cuando Harry conoció a Sally", Multiteatro.

References

External links
 

Argentine male television actors
1954 births
Living people